The 2019 Klagenfurt Open  was a professional nine-ball pool tournament and the sixth of seven Euro Tour events of the 2019 Euro Tour season. The men's event was be held between 11 and 13 October, whilst the women's event was held from 13 to 14 October 2019, held at the Sportpark Klagenfurt in Klagenfurt, Austria. The event featured a total prize fund of €38,000, with the winner of each event winning €4,500.

Mario He was the defending champion of the men's event, having defeated Mark Gray 9–8 in the final of the 2018 Klagenfurt Open. He reached the last 32 of the competition, before losing 9–1 to Eklent Kaçi. Greece's Alexander Kazakis won the event, defeating Dutch player Marc Bijsterbosch in the final 9–8. The defending champion of the women's event was Austrian player Jasmin Ouschan who defeated Ana Gradišnik in the 2018 final. Poland's Oliwia Czuprynska won the event, defeating Ouschan in the semi-finals, and Belarusian Marharyta Fefilava in the final 7–5.

Tournament format
The event was held from 11 to 13 October for the men's event, and 13 to 14 October for the women's event. The event was played as a double elimination knockout tournament, until the last-32 stage for the men's event, and the last-16 for the women; where the tournament was contested as a single elimination bracket. Matches were all played as -to-nine- in the men's, and race-to-seven-racks in the women's event.

The defending champions for the event were Austrian players Mario He and Jasmin Ouschan, who defeated Eklent Kaçi and Oliwia Czupryńska respectively in the finals of the 2018 Klagenfurt Open.

Prize fund 
The tournament prize fund was similar to that of other Euro Tour events, with €4,500 awarded to the winner of both event.

Tournament results

Men's event
The following matches are from the round of 32 onward. Players in bold denote match winners.

Women's event
Below is the brackets from the single elimination round. Players in brackets denote match winners.

References

External links

 Official Website

Euro Tour
Leende Open
Leende Open
Leende Open
International sports competitions hosted by Austria
Sports competitions in Klagenfurt